Mixed White and Asian is an ethnic group category that was first introduced by the United Kingdom's Office for National Statistics for the 2001 Census. Colloquially it refers to British citizens or residents whose parents are of a White (unspecificed) ethnic background and Asian (unspecified) ethnic background. This classification is only used in England and Wales, as Scotland and Northern Ireland do not have sub categories for their mixed group options.

They have a total population of 488,225 representing 0.8% of England and Wales, an increase from 341,727 in 2011 and 189,015 in 2001.

Demographics 

The White and Asian Mixed population has increased with each decennial census, starting from 189,015 people with the category's introduction in 2001, rising to 341,727 in 2011 to now 488,225 in 2021 in England and Wales.

Religion

See also 

 Mixed (United Kingdom ethnicity category)
 Mixed White and Black African people in the United Kingdom
 Mixed White and Black Caribbean (United Kingdom ethnicity category)

References 

Asian-British culture in England
Sub-ethnic groups